Dr. Albert Abraham Mason (192616 May 2018) was an anesthesiologist at Queen Victoria Hospital in East Grinstead, England who used hypnosis to treat pain and common ailments. He is known for his accidental treatment of epidermolytic hyperkeratosis through hypnosis. He reportedly stumbled upon this treatment in 1952.

Publications

References

External links 
 Publications at PubMed

1926 births
2018 deaths
American anesthesiologists
American expatriates in the United Kingdom
American hypnotists
British hypnotists